The Under-Pup is a 1939 American feature film by Richard Wallace that introduced soprano singing star Gloria Jean to the screen.

Plot
The story, adapted by Grover Jones from a magazine story by Australian author I. A. R. Wylie, casts Gloria as a streetwise girl who is sent to a summer camp for wealthy girls. She is at first bullied by the other girls, but she stands up for herself and wins everyone over, including the girl who had bullied her the most, to earn a place in their group, "The Purple Order of Penguins".

Cast

Production
Filming took place from May to June 1939. It was originally budgeted at $445,000.

Reception
The film had its premiere in Scranton.

The film was well received, and was followed by an unofficial sequel, A Little Bit of Heaven (1940). Many of the cast members from The Under-Pup appear in the second film, but with different character names.

Radio adaptation
The film script was adapted for radio and was presented on Lux Radio Theater on April 15, 1940, with Gloria Jean and Nan Grey reprising their film roles.

References

External links 
 

1939 films
American black-and-white films
Films directed by Richard Wallace
Universal Pictures films
1939 musical films
Films produced by Joe Pasternak
American musical films
Films based on works by I. A. R. Wylie
1930s English-language films
1930s American films